Rafał Grzyb (born 16 January 1983 in Jędrzejów) is a Polish professional football manager and former player who is the assistant coach of Ekstraklasa club Jagiellonia Białystok. He is also the councilor of the city of Białystok from the Civic Coalition committee.

Club career
He is a home-grown of Wierna Małogoszcz. In January 2011, he moved from Polonia Bytom to Jagiellonia Białystok on two and a half contract. In the latter team, he finished his career after the 2018–19 Ekstraklasa autumn round.

Managerial career
On 8 December 2019, he was appointed as the interim manager of Jagiellonia Białystok after Ireneusz Mamrot.

On 17 March 2021, he was appointed as the manager of Jagiellonia Białystok after Bogdan Zając. Despite his initial temporary presence, he has been working in this position for several months. On June 4 he was replaced by Ireneusz Mamrot.

Politics
In the 2018 Polish local elections, he ran for the councilor of the city of Białystok from the Civic Coalition committee. He received 755 votes and, according to the calculations of the National Electoral Commission, it was not enough to get a seat. However, thanks to resignation from the mandate of councilor Tadeusz Truskolaski, Grzyb took his place in the newly appointed city council.

Honours

Player
Jagiellonia Białystok
 Polish Cup: 2009–10
 Polish SuperCup: 2010

References

External links
  
 

1983 births
Living people
People from Jędrzejów County
Sportspeople from Świętokrzyskie Voivodeship
Polish footballers
Górnik Łęczna players
Polonia Bytom players
Jagiellonia Białystok players
Ekstraklasa players
Association football midfielders